KROE (930 AM) is a radio station broadcasting a News Talk Information format. Licensed to Sheridan, Wyoming, United States, the station is currently owned by Lovcom, Inc., and features programing from CBS News Radio, Fox News Radio, NBC News Radio, Compass Media Networks, Genesis Communications Network, Premiere Networks, USA Radio Network, and Westwood One.

All Lovcom stations are located in the Sheridan Media Radio Center, at 1716 KROE Lane on Sheridan's east side.

History
KROE first signed on the air on March 18, 1961, with a studio located at 47 South Scott Street in Sheridan. Studios were moved to the former KWYO studio location at 21 North Main Street in 1963, and later moved to a mobile home east of Sheridan on a road known as "dump road" (because it led to the local landfill). A new building was erected adjacent to the mobile home and transmission tower when the present owner acquired the station in 1974. The company also added a sister station, KROE-FM, broadcasting at 94.9 MHz. By the 1980s, KROE had increased power from 1,000 Watts to 5,000 Watts, and the road on which it was located had a new name: KROE Lane. The KROE building was renovated in 2001/2002, and as of 2017, houses six radio stations (KROE, KWYO, KLQQ, KOWY, KYTI and KZWY), as well as multiple HD multicast channels and FM translators.

Programming
In 1983, KROE stopped playing vinyl records on air and moved to a reel to reel medium. In the 1980s, popular programs included "Polka Party", featuring polka music and stories delivered in Polish. Another popular program was the "Make Believe Ballroom," with 1940s big band music. The Polka Party ended in the mid 1990s, and the Big Band show moved to KWYO in 1998. The music on KROE was switched to a Westwood One satellite-delivered country music format in the 1990s.

In 1997, station owner Lovcom, Inc. acquired a competing FM station. The call letters of that station were changed from KWYO-FM to KYTI and it became the country music station, while the format on KROE was changed to oldies. Throughout the 80s and 90s, KROE was known for local sports coverage, including live play-by-play of local area football and basketball games. KROE changed formats again in July 2004, dropping music in favor of a strictly News Talk Information format. The sports coverage was moved to sister station KWYO.

Long-time programs remain on KROE, including Swap Shop (an on-air flea market), and the local public affairs call-in program, Public Pulse. The current lineup also includes syndicated political talk show hosts Rush Limbaugh, Michael Medved, Sean Hannity, Joe Paggs, Jim Bohannon and others. KROE is a CBS news affiliate.

In January 2017, KROE began rebroadcasting at 103.9 FM on translator K280GK.

References

External links
KROE official website

ROE
News and talk radio stations in the United States